Rădăcineşti may refer to several places in Romania:

Rădăcineşti, a village in Berislăvești Commune, Vâlcea County
Rădăcineşti, a village in Corbița Commune, Vrancea County